Procollagen-lysine,2-oxoglutarate 5-dioxygenase 3 is an enzyme that in humans is encoded by the PLOD3 gene.

The protein encoded by this gene is a membrane-bound homodimeric enzyme that is localized to the cisternae of the rough endoplasmic reticulum. The enzyme (cofactors iron and ascorbate) catalyzes the hydroxylation of lysyl residues in collagen-like peptides. The resultant hydroxylysyl groups are attachment sites for carbohydrates in collagen and thus are critical for the stability of intermolecular crosslinks. Some patients with Ehlers-Danlos syndrome type VIB have deficiencies in lysyl hydroxylase activity.

References

Further reading